The 1998 United States Senate election in Utah was held November 3, 1998. Incumbent Republican U.S. Senator Bob Bennett won re-election to a second term.

Major candidates

Democratic 
 Scott Leckman, physician

Republican 
 Bob Bennett, incumbent U.S. Senator

Results

See also 
 1998 United States Senate elections

References 

United States Senate
Utah
1998